Robert Semple (21 October 1873 – 31 January 1955) was a union leader and later Minister of Public Works for the first Labour Government of New Zealand. He is also known for creating the Bob Semple tank.

Early life
He was born in Sofala, New South Wales, Australia.  He started working at an early age as gold miner in Australia.  In 1903 he was involved in a miner's strike in Victoria, Australia.  The strike was defeated and Semple ended up being blacklisted.

To avoid the blacklist Semple moved to the West Coast of the South Island of New Zealand.  By 1907 he was president of the Runanga Miner's Union and earned himself nickname 'Fighting Bob Semple'.

He was jailed in 1913 for supporting the general strike and again in 1916 after fighting conscription for overseas service during World War I. Semple served as the President of the Labour Party from 1926 to 1928.

Semple was a member of the Wellington City Council for a decade between 1925 and 1935. In 1935 he unsuccessfully stood for Mayor of Wellington, coming runner-up to Thomas Hislop. His wife Margaret was also a Wellington City Councillor from 1938 to 1941.

Parliamentary career 

Semple was elected to the seat of Wellington South Parliament for Labour in a 1918 by-election, but lost the seat in the 1919 general election. In 1928 he won the Wellington East seat, and held it until 1946, when it was renamed Miramar.  He then held Miramar until 1954, when he retired.

In 1935, he was awarded the King George V Silver Jubilee Medal. Semple was a prolific user of "unparliamentary language" during his time as an MP, and was fond of insulting colleagues by calling or comparing them to Australian animals such as kookaburras, kangaroos and dingoes.

During his term in Parliament, Semple held many important infrastructure portfolios, such as Minister of Public Works (1935–1941, 1942–1943) and Minister of Railways (1941–1949). Semple was seen by many as the public face of the first Labour government's infrastructure investment. He reshaped the Public Works Department by resuming its original function as the development arm of the government by phasing out its focus on relief work from the Great Depression. 

During World War II he had built the 'Bob Semple tank', made from corrugated iron and a tractor base. The tank had numerous design flaws and other practical problems and was never put into production. In later life, he became an ardent anti-communist. He did not seek re-election in the 1954 election, and died in New Plymouth in January 1955.

Notes

External links

References 

 

|-

|-

|-

|-

|-

|-

1873 births
1955 deaths
New Zealand Labour Party MPs
People from the Central West (New South Wales)
Australian emigrants to New Zealand
Members of the Cabinet of New Zealand
New Zealand trade unionists
New Zealand conscientious objectors
Members of the New Zealand House of Representatives
New Zealand MPs for Wellington electorates
Unsuccessful candidates in the 1919 New Zealand general election
Unsuccessful candidates in the 1925 New Zealand general election
New Zealand politicians convicted of crimes
Social Democratic Party (New Zealand) politicians
Wellington City Councillors
New Zealand Socialist Party politicians
Wellington Harbour Board members
New Zealand anti–World War I activists
Industrial Workers of the World members